Irene Caba Alba (25 August 1905 – 14 January 1957) was an Argentine-born Spanish stage and film actress. She appeared in forty films during her career including The Nail. She was born into a family of actors, the daughter of Irene Alba and the sister of Julia Caba Alba.

Filmography
 The Dancer and the Worker (1936)
 Nuestra Natacha (1936)
 Madre Alegría (1937)
 Nuestro culpable (1938)
 Il peccato di Rogelia Sanchez (1940)
 Santa Rogelia (1940)
 La nascita di Salomè (1940)
 Fortuna (1940)
 Whirlwind (1941)
 ¡A mí no me mire usted! (1941)
 ¿Por qué vivir tristes? (1942)
 Boda en el infierno (1942)
 Te quiero para mí (1944)
 The Nail (1944)
 Thirsty Land  (1945)
 Cinco lobitos (1945)
The Prodigal Woman (1946)
 '-Las inquietudes de Shanti Andía (1947)
 The Faith (1947)
 The Sunless Street (1948)
 Guest of Darkness (1948)
 The Duchess of Benameji (1949)
 That Luzmela Girl (1949)
 Woman to Woman (1950)
 La niña de Luzmela (1950)
 Torturados (1952)
 La laguna negra (1952)
 Jeromín (1953)
 Such is Madrid (1953)
 Boyfriend in Sight (1954)
 Viento del norte (1954)
 Un caballero andaluz (1954)
 An Andalusian Gentleman (1954)
 An Impossible Crime (1954)
 We Two (1955)
 Un día perdido (1955)
 La lupa (1955)
 El piyayo (1956)
 The Big Lie (1956)
 La vida en un bloc (1956)
 Piedras vivas (1956) La ironía del dinero (1957)

 References 

 Bibliography 
 Hortelano, Lorenzo J. Torres.  Directory of World Cinema: Spain''. Intellect Books, 2011.

External links 
 

1905 births
1957 deaths
Argentine emigrants to Spain
Argentine film actresses
Argentine stage actresses
Spanish film actresses
Spanish stage actresses
Actresses from Buenos Aires
20th-century Argentine actresses
20th-century Spanish actresses